Kuh Kamar or Kooh Kamar may refer to:
 Kuh Kamar, East Azerbaijan
 Kuh Kamar, Golestan
 Kuh Kamar, North Khorasan